Cricket Snapper is an independent film written, directed and produced by Lawson Welles. The film is based on the true story of Barbara Asher, who was charged but acquitted of the manslaughter and dismemberment of Michael Lord, a New Hampshire man who allegedly suffered a heart attack while chained in her dungeon. Rather than call the authorities, police said Asher confessed she and her boyfriend chopped up Lord's body in the bathtub and dumped it behind a Maine restaurant, but DNA testing of her bathtub revealed none of Lord's DNA or any evidence of cleaning agents. According to the Quincy Patriot-Ledger story covering the film's Boston premiere on May 6, 2011, the dominatrix's boyfriend, Miguel Ferrer "was charged with being an accessory after the fact, has never been tried" and "fled after being indicted."

In Welles’ film, the dominatrix and her husband dump the body, but then are hunted down and murdered themselves out in the dark, snow-covered woods of Massachusetts by a vicious serial killer. The soundtrack to Cricket Snapper includes tracks by Church of Satan High Priests, Anton LaVey and Peter H. Gilmore. Cricket Snapper was released on October 10, 2005, the twentieth anniversary of the death of Lawson's hero of the same surname, Orson Welles. Lawson Welles was born on the 60th birthday of Orson Welles. Cricket Snapper cinematographer, Jerry Bagdasarian, was a veteran of the D-Day landings and worked on Rod Serling's Twilight Zone series before working on independent films. Welles got the idea for the title after first meeting Bagdasarian to interview him over his experiences in World War II. Jerry showed Lawson a cricket snapper, a device paratroopers from the 82nd Airborne and 101st Airborne units used to communicate with one another. Cricket Snapper is not the first film to feature this device, as John Wayne explained its usage to his men in the World War II epic, The Longest Day.
The soundtrack to Cricket Snapper includes tracks by Bill McElaney, Church of Satan High Priests, Anton LaVey and Peter H. Gilmore.

External links 
 https://web.archive.org/web/20061219095831/http://www.oldnickmagazine.com/lawson_feature.php
 https://web.archive.org/web/20070930040739/http://www.zwire.com/site/news.cfm?newsid=13114749&BRD=1713&PAG=461&dept_id=24491&rfi=6
 http://pawtuckettimes.com/site/...?brd=1713&dept_id=24491&newsid=13114749
 https://web.archive.org/web/20061025164541/http://seacoastonline.com/news/hampton/01272006/news/84993.htm
 http://ledger.southofboston.com/articles/2006/01/12/news/news05.txt

2005 films
Crime films based on actual events
2000s crime films